Hayley Carter and Ena Shibahara were the defending champions, but Shibahara chose not to participate this year.

Carter played alongside Luisa Stefani and successfully defended the title, defeating Marie Benoît and Jessika Ponchet in the final, 6–1, 6–3.

Seeds

Draw

Draw

References

External Links
Main Draw

Oracle Challenger Series – Newport Beach - Doubles
Oracle Challenger Series – Newport Beach